The 2021–22 Columbia Lions men's basketball team represented Columbia University in the 2021–22 NCAA Division I men's basketball season. The Lions, led by fifth-year head coach Jim Engles, played their home games at Levien Gymnasium in New York City as members of the Ivy League.

Previous season
Due to the COVID-19 pandemic, the Ivy League chose not to conduct a season in 2020–21.

Roster

Schedule and results

|-
!colspan=12 style=| Non-conference regular season

|-
!colspan=9 style=| Ivy League regular season

Sources

See also
 2021–22 Columbia Lions women's basketball team

References

Columbia Lions men's basketball seasons
Columbia Lions
Columbia Lions men's basketball
Columbia Lions men's basketball